Jot Em Down is a small unincorporated community in Delta County, Texas, United States.

The town's name comes from the name of a fictional store in the Lum and Abner radio show. "Jot 'Em Down" has been noted for its unusual place name.

See also 
 Lum 'n' Abner Jot 'Em Down Store and Museum
 Jot-Um-Down, North Carolina
 Pine Ridge, Arkansas
 Pine Ridge, Oklahoma

References 

Unincorporated communities in Texas
Unincorporated communities in Delta County, Texas
Ghost towns in East Texas
Lum and Abner